Mengkuang Titi is a small Malay village in Central Seberang Perai District, Penang, Malaysia. It is located not too far from the Mengkuang Dam. The village has a population of about 800, and still retains the rustic feel ideal for the development of agricultural and cottage industries.

Etymology
The word 'Mengkuang' comes from the vernacular name for Pandanus fascicularis a kind of Pandanus plant that inhabit the region.  The word 'Titi' means bridge. The combination of these two words give the meaning 'The Mengkuang area where a bridge was built'. It is common to find word 'Mengkuang' in surrounding region because Kampung Mengkuang actually  refers the wider whole neighborhood area. Names of the some neighborhood villages are Mengkuang Kereta Api ('kereta api' means train, Mengkuang where railway was built), Mengkuang Sekolah ('sekolah' means school, Mengkuang where school was built  and Mengkuang Dam (Dam means a barrier constructed across a waterway, Mengkuang where dam was constructed).

Economy

Agriculture and cottage industries
Agriculture and cottage industries are still the main sources of income. Among the cottage industries at Mengkuang Titi includes the making of Malay delicacies such as kuih bahulu, a fluffy sponge cake, and satay, grilled skewered meat served in sweet and spicy peanut sauce. People of Mengkuang Titi used to grow rubber, paddy, coconut and oil palm, but now the most of the land was replaced by housing. The only plantation can be found now is oil palm estate. The vegetable crops such as onion, cauliflower, maize etc. was introduce to the village.

Tourism
Mengkuang Titi is one of the village in Penang on the Homestay Programme. There is indeed much to see and do in the kampung. One can walk through a canopy of rubber trees, try a hand at rubber tapping and observe how latex is processed into rubber sheets. Visitors can also visit the oil palm estates and stroll amidst its neat rows of palm fronds and huge bunches of flaming orange-red oil palm fruits. Visitor should also look out for the awesome mengkuang plants from which the village got its name. It is really interesting to see how these long sharp, serrated swords like leaves are harvested, and then slowly processed into fine colourful strips ready for weaving. At the cottage industry centre nearby, one can learn the art of bahulu making.

Others
Even the agriculture and cottage industries are the main economic activities, most of the villagers are now working in the big towns such as Bukit Mertajam, Butterworth, George Town and industrial parks such as Kulim Hi-Tech Park, Prai Industrial Estate and Bayan Baru Technology Park.

Culture
Most of the villagers are practicing the traditional Malay culture with mixture from minority of Chinese and Indians.

Traditional games
Traditional Malay games are also promoted at Mengkuang Titi. These include top spinning, or gasing, bola sepak sarung and sepak raga, played by the men and congkak by the women.

Foods
Mengkuang Titi is the best place to try the Malay Traditional food such as bahulu, kuih bangkit or coconut Cookies, satay and various of traditional snacks.

How to get there
From Kuala Lumpur and Ipoh (from south) or Sungai Petani or Alor Star, exit the North South Expressway at the Seberang Jaya Interchange (Exit 163). Take the Butterworth Kulim Expressway (E15) east and exit it at the Mengkuang Lake Dam Interchange (Exit 1507). At the t-junction, turn left and head east on Jalan Penanti-Kulim. At the next junction, turn right and head north along Jalan Lunas. If from Kulim and east, right turn at the junction in front and underpasses the Butterworth Kulim Expressway. Continue along this road (P129). When you reach a road fork, take the right fork down state road P119. Continue along P119 until you reach Mengkuang Titi. The only available public transports are taxi and bus. By bus, from the Bukit Mertajam bus terminal, you should take bus no. 51.

See also

Penang
Province Wellesley
Mengkuang
Mengkuang Dam

References

External links

Villages in Penang